Publius Claudius Pulcher (died 249 BC/246 BC) was a Roman politician.

Family
Son of Appius Claudius Caecus, Publius was the first of the Claudii to be given the cognomen "Pulcher" ("handsome"). He was also the father of Appius Claudius Pulcher, consul in 212 BC.

Career
Curule aedile in 253 BC, as consul in 249 he was given command of the Roman fleet during the First Punic War. He lost the Battle of Drepana against the Carthaginians after ignoring a bad omen. According to Valerius Maximus, Suetonius and Cicero, when the sacred chickens refused to eat, Claudius threw them into the sea, saying: "Since they do not wish to eat, let them drink!" (Latin "Bibant, quoniam edere nollent"). He was recalled to Rome and ordered to appoint a dictator; his nomination of his subordinate Marcus Claudius Glicia was overruled. He was tried for incompetence and impiety, avoiding capital or corporal punishment due to double jeopardy and was instead fined a 120,000 assēs, 1,000 for each ship Rome had lost in the battle against Carthage. He died soon afterwards, possibly by suicide.

References

External links
 

240s BC deaths
3rd-century BC Roman consuls
Claudii Pulchri
Roman commanders of the First Punic War
Ancient Roman generals
Year of birth unknown
Year of death uncertain